Events from the year 1915 in Sweden

Incumbents
 Monarch – Gustaf V
 Prime Minister - Hjalmar Hammarskjöld

Events

 6 February - Federation of Swedish Farmers is founded.

Births

 4 April – Lars Ahlin, novelist and (died 1997)
 29 August – Ingrid Bergman, film actress (died 1982 in the United Kingdom)

Deaths
 23 January – Sofia Gumaelius, businessperson  (born 1840) 
 2 June – Ingeborg Rönnblad, actress (born 1873)
 15 June – Eugène Jansson, painter  (born 1842) 
 Hilda Sjölin, photographer   (born 1835)

References

 
Years of the 20th century in Sweden
Sweden